Marsala is an Italian surname, originated from the city of Marsala, in Sicily. Notable people with the surname include: 

 Joe Marsala (1907–1978), Italian-American jazz clarinetist and songwriter
 Marty Marsala (1909–1975), American jazz trumpeter, brother of Joe

Italian-language surnames